Atrophic connective tissue panniculitis is a rare condition, and often occurs on the upper or lower extremities.

See also 
 Involutional lipoatrophy
 List of cutaneous conditions

References 

Conditions of the subcutaneous fat